An earthquake (also known as a quake, tremor or temblor) is the shaking of the surface of the Earth resulting from a sudden release of energy in the Earth's lithosphere that creates seismic waves. Earthquakes can range in intensity, from those that are so weak that they cannot be felt, to those violent enough to propel objects and people into the air, damage critical infrastructure, and wreak destruction across entire cities. The seismic activity of an area is the frequency, type, and size of earthquakes experienced over a particular time. The seismicity at a particular location in the Earth is the average rate of seismic energy release per unit volume.  The word tremor is also used for non-earthquake seismic rumbling.

At the Earth's surface, earthquakes manifest themselves by shaking and displacing or disrupting the ground. When the epicenter of a large earthquake is located offshore, the seabed may be displaced sufficiently to cause a tsunami. Earthquakes can also trigger landslides.

In its most general sense, the word earthquake is used to describe any seismic event—whether natural or caused by humans—that generates seismic waves. Earthquakes are caused mostly by rupture of geological faults but also by other events such as volcanic activity, landslides, mine blasts, and nuclear tests. An earthquake's point of initial rupture is called its hypocenter or focus. The epicenter is the point at ground level directly above the hypocenter.

Natural occurrence

Tectonic earthquakes occur anywhere in the earth where there is sufficient stored elastic strain energy to drive fracture propagation along a fault plane. The sides of a fault move past each other smoothly and aseismically only if there are no irregularities or asperities along the fault surface that increases the frictional resistance. Most fault surfaces do have such asperities, which leads to a form of stick-slip behavior. Once the fault has locked, continued relative motion between the plates leads to increasing stress and, therefore, stored strain energy in the volume around the fault surface. This continues until the stress has risen sufficiently to break through the asperity, suddenly allowing sliding over the locked portion of the fault, releasing the stored energy. This energy is released as a combination of radiated elastic strain seismic waves, frictional heating of the fault surface, and cracking of the rock, thus causing an earthquake. This process of gradual build-up of strain and stress punctuated by occasional sudden earthquake failure is referred to as the elastic-rebound theory. It is estimated that only 10 percent or less of an earthquake's total energy is radiated as seismic energy. Most of the earthquake's energy is used to power the earthquake fracture growth or is converted into heat generated by friction. Therefore, earthquakes lower the Earth's available elastic potential energy and raise its temperature, though these changes are negligible compared to the conductive and convective flow of heat out from the Earth's deep interior.

Fault types

There are three main types of fault, all of which may cause an interplate earthquake: normal, reverse (thrust), and strike-slip. Normal and reverse faulting are examples of dip-slip, where the displacement along the fault is in the direction of dip and where movement on them involves a vertical component. Many earthquakes are caused by movement on faults that have components of both dip-slip and strike-slip; this is known as oblique slip. The topmost, brittle part of the Earth's crust, and the cool slabs of the tectonic plates that are descending into the hot mantle, are the only parts of our planet that can store elastic energy and release it in fault ruptures. Rocks hotter than about  flow in response to stress; they do not rupture in earthquakes. Examples are the earthquakes in Alaska (1957), Chile (1960), and Sumatra (2004), all in subduction zones. The longest earthquake ruptures on strike-slip faults, like the San Andreas Fault (1857, 1906), the North Anatolian Fault in Turkey (1939), and the Denali Fault in Alaska (2002), are about half to one third as long as the lengths along subducting plate margins, and those along normal faults are even shorter.

Normal faults 
Normal faults occur mainly in areas where the crust is being extended such as a divergent boundary. Earthquakes associated with normal faults are generally less than magnitude 7.

Reverse faults 
Reverse faults occur in areas where the crust is being shortened such as at a convergent boundary. Reverse faults, particularly those along convergent plate boundaries, are associated with the most powerful earthquakes, megathrust earthquakes, including almost all of those of magnitude 8 or more. Megathrust earthquakes are responsible for about 90% of the total seismic moment released worldwide.

Strike-slip faults 
Strike-slip faults are steep structures where the two sides of the fault slip horizontally past each other; transform boundaries are a particular type of strike-slip fault. Strike-slip faults, particularly continental transforms, can produce major earthquakes up to about magnitude 8. Strike-slip faults tend to be oriented near vertically, resulting in an approximate width of  within the brittle crust. Thus, earthquakes with magnitudes much larger than 8 are not possible.

In addition, there exists a hierarchy of stress levels in the three fault types. Thrust faults are generated by the highest, strike-slip by intermediate, and normal faults by the lowest stress levels. This can easily be understood by considering the direction of the greatest principal stress, the direction of the force that "pushes" the rock mass during the faulting. In the case of normal faults, the rock mass is pushed down in a vertical direction, thus the pushing force (greatest principal stress) equals the weight of the rock mass itself. In the case of thrusting, the rock mass "escapes" in the direction of the least principal stress, namely upward, lifting the rock mass, and thus, the overburden equals the least principal stress. Strike-slip faulting is intermediate between the other two types described above. This difference in stress regime in the three faulting environments can contribute to differences in stress drop during faulting, which contributes to differences in the radiated energy, regardless of fault dimensions.

Energy released 
For every unit increase in magnitude, there is a roughly thirtyfold increase in the energy released. For instance, an earthquake of magnitude 6.0 releases approximately 32 times more energy than a 5.0 magnitude earthquake and a 7.0 magnitude earthquake releases 1,000 times more energy than a 5.0 magnitude earthquake. An 8.6 magnitude earthquake releases the same amount of energy as 10,000 atomic bombs of the size used in World War II.

This is so because the energy released in an earthquake, and thus its magnitude, is proportional to the area of the fault that ruptures and the stress drop. Therefore, the longer the length and the wider the width of the faulted area, the larger the resulting magnitude. The most important parameter controlling the maximum earthquake magnitude on a fault, however, is not the maximum available length, but the available width because the latter varies by a factor of 20. Along converging plate margins, the dip angle of the rupture plane is very shallow, typically about 10 degrees. Thus, the width of the plane within the top brittle crust of the Earth can become  (Japan, 2011; Alaska, 1964), making the most powerful earthquakes possible.

Focus

The majority of tectonic earthquakes originate in the Ring of Fire at depths not exceeding tens of kilometers. In subduction zones, where older and colder oceanic crust descends beneath another tectonic plate, deep-focus earthquakes may occur at much greater depths (ranging from ). These seismically active areas of subduction are known as Wadati–Benioff zones. Deep-focus earthquakes occur at a depth where the subducted lithosphere should no longer be brittle, due to the high temperature and pressure. A possible mechanism for the generation of deep-focus earthquakes is faulting caused by olivine undergoing a phase transition into a spinel structure.

Volcanic activity

Earthquakes often occur in volcanic regions and are caused there, both by tectonic faults and the movement of magma in volcanoes. Such earthquakes can serve as an early warning of volcanic eruptions, as during the 1980 eruption of Mount St. Helens. Earthquake swarms can serve as markers for the location of the flowing magma throughout the volcanoes. These swarms can be recorded by seismometers and tiltmeters (a device that measures ground slope) and used as sensors to predict imminent or upcoming eruptions.

Rupture dynamics
A tectonic earthquake begins as an area of initial slip on the fault surface that forms the focus. Once the rupture has been initiated, it begins to propagate away from the focus, spreading out along the fault surface. Lateral propagation will continue until either the rupture reaches a barrier, such as the end of a fault segment, or a region on the fault where there is insufficient stress to allow continued rupture. For larger earthquakes, the depth extent of rupture will be constrained downwards by the brittle-ductile transition zone and upwards by the ground surface. The mechanics of this process are poorly understood because it is difficult either to recreate such rapid movements in a laboratory or to record seismic waves close to a nucleation zone due to strong ground motion.

In most cases the rupture speed approaches, but does not exceed, the shear wave (S-wave) velocity of the surrounding rock. There are a few exceptions to this:

Supershear earthquakes 
Supershear earthquake ruptures are known to have propagated at speeds greater than the S-wave velocity. These have so far all been observed during large strike-slip events. The unusually wide zone of damage caused by the 2001 Kunlun earthquake has been attributed to the effects of the sonic boom developed in such earthquakes.

Slow earthquakes 
Slow earthquake ruptures travel at unusually low velocities. A particularly dangerous form of slow earthquake is the tsunami earthquake, observed where the relatively low felt intensities, caused by the slow propagation speed of some great earthquakes, fail to alert the population of the neighboring coast, as in the 1896 Sanriku earthquake.

Co-seismic overpressuring and effect of pore pressure
During an earthquake, high temperatures can develop at the fault plane, increasing pore pressure and consequently vaporization of the groundwater already contained within the rock. 
In the coseismic phase, a such increase can significantly affect slip evolution and speed, in the post-seismic phase it can control the Aftershock sequence because, after the main event, pore pressure increase slowly propagates into the surrounding fracture network.
From the point of view of the Mohr-Coulomb strength theory, an increase in fluid pressure reduces the normal stress acting on the fault plane that holds it in place, and fluids can exert a lubricating effect.
As thermal overpressurization may provide positive feedback between slip and strength fall at the fault plane, a common opinion is that it may enhance the faulting process instability. After the mainshock, the pressure gradient between the fault plane and the neighboring rock causes a fluid flow that increases pore pressure in the surrounding fracture networks; such an increase may trigger new faulting processes by reactivating adjacent faults, giving rise to aftershocks. Analogously, artificial pore pressure increase, by fluid injection in Earth's crust, may induce seismicity.

Tidal forces

Tides may induce some seismicity.

Clusters
Most earthquakes form part of a sequence, related to each other in terms of location and time. Most earthquake clusters consist of small tremors that cause little to no damage, but there is a theory that earthquakes can recur in a regular pattern. Earthquake clustering has been observed, for example, in Parkfield, California where a long term research study is being conducted around the Parkfield earthquake cluster.

Aftershocks

An aftershock is an earthquake that occurs after a previous earthquake, the mainshock. Rapid changes of stress between rocks, and the stress from the original earthquake are the main causes of these aftershocks, along with the crust around the ruptured fault plane as it adjusts to the effects of the mainshock. An aftershock is in the same region as the main shock but always of a smaller magnitude, however, they can still be powerful enough to cause even more damage to buildings that were already previously damaged from the mainshock. If an aftershock is larger than the mainshock, the aftershock is redesignated as the mainshock and the original main shock is redesignated as a foreshock. Aftershocks are formed as the crust around the displaced fault plane adjusts to the effects of the mainshock.

Swarms 

Earthquake swarms are sequences of earthquakes striking in a specific area within a short period. They are different from earthquakes followed by a series of aftershocks by the fact that no single earthquake in the sequence is the main shock, so none has a notably higher magnitude than another. An example of an earthquake swarm is the 2004 activity at Yellowstone National Park. In August 2012, a swarm of earthquakes shook Southern California's Imperial Valley, showing the most recorded activity in the area since the 1970s.

Sometimes a series of earthquakes occur in what has been called an earthquake storm, where the earthquakes strike a fault in clusters, each triggered by the shaking or stress redistribution of the previous earthquakes. Similar to aftershocks but on adjacent segments of fault, these storms occur over the course of years, with some of the later earthquakes as damaging as the early ones. Such a pattern was observed in the sequence of about a dozen earthquakes that struck the North Anatolian Fault in Turkey in the 20th century and has been inferred for older anomalous clusters of large earthquakes in the Middle East.

Intensity and magnitude 
The shaking of the earth is a common phenomenon that has been experienced by humans from the earliest of times. Before the development of strong-motion accelerometers, the intensity of a seismic event was estimated based on the observed effects. Magnitude and intensity are not directly related and calculated using different methods. The magnitude of an earthquake is a single value that describes the size of the earthquake at its source. Intensity is the measure of shaking at different locations around the earthquake. Intensity values vary from place to place, depending on the distance from the earthquake and the underlying rock or soil makeup.

The first scale for measuring earthquake magnitudes was developed by Charles Francis Richter in 1935. Subsequent scales (see seismic magnitude scales) have retained a key feature, where each unit represents a ten-fold difference in the amplitude of the ground shaking and a 32-fold difference in energy. Subsequent scales are also adjusted to have approximately the same numeric value within the limits of the scale.

Although the mass media commonly reports earthquake magnitudes as "Richter magnitude" or "Richter scale", standard practice by most seismological authorities is to express an earthquake's strength on the moment magnitude scale, which is based on the actual energy released by an earthquake.

Frequency of occurrence
It is estimated that around 500,000 earthquakes occur each year, detectable with current instrumentation. About 100,000 of these can be felt. Minor earthquakes occur nearly constantly around the world in places like California and Alaska in the U.S., as well as in El Salvador, Mexico, Guatemala, Chile, Peru, Indonesia, the Philippines, Iran, Pakistan, the Azores in Portugal, Turkey, New Zealand, Greece, Italy, India, Nepal, and Japan. Larger earthquakes occur less frequently, the relationship being exponential; for example, roughly ten times as many earthquakes larger than magnitude 4 occur in a particular time than earthquakes larger than magnitude 5. In the (low seismicity) United Kingdom, for example, it has been calculated that the average recurrences are:
an earthquake of 3.7–4.6 every year, an earthquake of 4.7–5.5 every 10 years, and an earthquake of 5.6 or larger every 100 years. This is an example of the Gutenberg–Richter law.

The number of seismic stations has increased from about 350 in 1931 to many thousands today. As a result, many more earthquakes are reported than in the past, but this is because of the vast improvement in instrumentation, rather than an increase in the number of earthquakes. The United States Geological Survey (USGS) estimates that, since 1900, there have been an average of 18 major earthquakes (magnitude 7.0–7.9) and one great earthquake (magnitude 8.0 or greater) per year, and that this average has been relatively stable. In recent years, the number of major earthquakes per year has decreased, though this is probably a statistical fluctuation rather than a systematic trend. More detailed statistics on the size and frequency of earthquakes is available from the United States Geological Survey.
A recent increase in the number of major earthquakes has been noted, which could be explained by a cyclical pattern of periods of intense tectonic activity, interspersed with longer periods of low intensity. However, accurate recordings of earthquakes only began in the early 1900s, so it is too early to categorically state that this is the case.

Massive earthquakes tend to occur along other plate boundaries too, such as along the Himalayan Mountains.

With the rapid growth of mega-cities such as Mexico City, Tokyo, and Tehran in areas of high seismic risk, some seismologists are warning that a single earthquake may claim the lives of up to three million people.

Induced seismicity

While most earthquakes are caused by the movement of the Earth's tectonic plates, human activity can also produce earthquakes. Activities both above ground and below may change the stresses and strains on the crust, including building reservoirs, extracting resources such as coal or oil, and injecting fluids underground for waste disposal or fracking. Most of these earthquakes have small magnitudes. The 5.7 magnitude 2011 Oklahoma earthquake is thought to have been caused by disposing wastewater from oil production into injection wells, and studies point to the state's oil industry as the cause of other earthquakes in the past century. A Columbia University paper suggested that the 8.0 magnitude 2008 Sichuan earthquake was induced by loading from the Zipingpu Dam, though the link has not been conclusively proved.

Measurement and location

The instrumental scales used to describe the size of an earthquake began with the Richter magnitude scale in the 1930s. It is a relatively simple measurement of an event's amplitude, and its use has become minimal in the 21st century. Seismic waves travel through the Earth's interior and can be recorded by seismometers at great distances. The surface wave magnitude was developed in the 1950s as a means to measure remote earthquakes and to improve the accuracy for larger events. The moment magnitude scale not only measures the amplitude of the shock but also takes into account the seismic moment (total rupture area, average slip of the fault, and rigidity of the rock). The Japan Meteorological Agency seismic intensity scale, the Medvedev–Sponheuer–Karnik scale, and the Mercalli intensity scale are based on the observed effects and are related to the intensity of shaking.

Seismic waves 
Every earthquake produces different types of seismic waves, which travel through rock with different velocities:
 Longitudinal P-waves (shock- or pressure waves)
 Transverse S-waves (both body waves)
 Surface waves – (Rayleigh and Love waves)

Speed of seismic waves 
In the Earth's interior, the shock- or P-waves travel much faster than the S-waves (approx. relation 1.7:1). The differences in travel time from the epicenter to the observatory are a measure of the distance and can be used to image both sources of earthquakes and structures within the Earth. Also, the depth of the hypocenter can be computed roughly.

P-wave speed 

S-waves speed 

Earths crust: per second

Seismic wave arrival 
As a consequence, the first waves of a distant earthquake arrive at an observatory via the Earth's mantle.

On average, the kilometer distance to the earthquake is the number of seconds between the P- and S-wave times 8. Slight deviations are caused by inhomogeneities of subsurface structure. By such analysis of seismograms, the Earth's core was located in 1913 by Beno Gutenberg.

S-waves and later arriving surface waves do most of the damage compared to P-waves. P-waves squeeze and expand the material in the same direction they are traveling, whereas S-waves shake the ground up and down and back and forth.

Location and reporting 
Earthquakes are not only categorized by their magnitude but also by the place where they occur. The world is divided into 754 Flinn–Engdahl regions (F-E regions), which are based on political and geographical boundaries as well as seismic activity. More active zones are divided into smaller F-E regions whereas less active zones belong to larger F-E regions.

Standard reporting of earthquakes includes its magnitude, date and time of occurrence, geographic coordinates of its epicenter, depth of the epicenter, geographical region, distances to population centers, location uncertainty, several parameters that are included in USGS earthquake reports (number of stations reporting, number of observations, etc.), and a unique event ID.

Although relatively slow seismic waves have traditionally been used to detect earthquakes, scientists realized in 2016 that gravitational measurement could provide instantaneous detection of earthquakes, and confirmed this by analyzing gravitational records associated with the 2011 Tohoku-Oki ("Fukushima") earthquake.

Effects

The effects of earthquakes include, but are not limited to, the following:

Shaking and ground rupture

Shaking and ground rupture are the main effects created by earthquakes, principally resulting in more or less severe damage to buildings and other rigid structures. The severity of the local effects depends on the complex combination of the earthquake magnitude, the distance from the epicenter, and the local geological and geomorphological conditions, which may amplify or reduce wave propagation. The ground-shaking is measured by ground acceleration.

Specific local geological, geomorphological, and geostructural features can induce high levels of shaking on the ground surface even from low-intensity earthquakes. This effect is called site or local amplification. It is principally due to the transfer of the seismic motion from hard deep soils to soft superficial soils and the effects of seismic energy focalization owing to the typical geometrical setting of such deposits.

Ground rupture is a visible breaking and displacement of the Earth's surface along the trace of the fault, which may be of the order of several meters in the case of major earthquakes. Ground rupture is a major risk for large engineering structures such as dams, bridges, and nuclear power stations and requires careful mapping of existing faults to identify any that are likely to break the ground surface within the life of the structure.

Soil liquefaction

Soil liquefaction occurs when, because of the shaking, water-saturated granular material (such as sand) temporarily loses its strength and transforms from a solid to a liquid. Soil liquefaction may cause rigid structures, like buildings and bridges, to tilt or sink into the liquefied deposits. For example, in the 1964 Alaska earthquake, soil liquefaction caused many buildings to sink into the ground, eventually collapsing upon themselves.

Human impacts

Physical damage from an earthquake will vary depending on the intensity of shaking in a given area and the type of population.  Undeserved and developing communities frequently experience more severe impacts (and longer lasting) from a seismic event compared to well-developed communities. Impacts may include:

 Injuries and loss of life 
 Damage to critical infrastructure (short and long-term)
 Roads, bridges, and public transportation networks
 Water, power, swear and gas interruption
 Communication systems
 Loss of critical community services including hospitals, police, and fire
 General property damage 
 Collapse or destabilization (potentially leading to future collapse) of buildings

With these impacts and others, the aftermath may bring disease, lack of basic necessities, mental consequences such as panic attacks, and depression to survivors, and higher insurance premiums. Recovery times will vary based on the level of damage along with the socioeconomic status of the impacted community.

Landslides

Earthquakes can produce slope instability leading to landslides, a major geological hazard. Landslide danger may persist while emergency personnel is attempting rescue work.

Fires

Earthquakes can cause fires by damaging electrical power or gas lines. In the event of water mains rupturing and a loss of pressure, it may also become difficult to stop the spread of a fire once it has started. For example, more deaths in the 1906 San Francisco earthquake were caused by fire than by the earthquake itself.

Tsunami

Tsunamis are long-wavelength, long-period sea waves produced by the sudden or abrupt movement of large volumes of water—including when an earthquake occurs at sea. In the open ocean, the distance between wave crests can surpass , and the wave periods can vary from five minutes to one hour. Such tsunamis travel 600–800 kilometers per hour (373–497 miles per hour), depending on water depth. Large waves produced by an earthquake or a submarine landslide can overrun nearby coastal areas in a matter of minutes. Tsunamis can also travel thousands of kilometers across open ocean and wreak destruction on far shores hours after the earthquake that generated them.

Ordinarily, subduction earthquakes under magnitude 7.5 do not cause tsunamis, although some instances of this have been recorded. Most destructive tsunamis are caused by earthquakes of magnitude 7.5 or more.

Floods

Floods may be secondary effects of earthquakes if dams are damaged. Earthquakes may cause landslips to dam rivers, which collapse and cause floods.

The terrain below the Sarez Lake in Tajikistan is in danger of catastrophic flooding if the landslide dam formed by the earthquake, known as the Usoi Dam, were to fail during a future earthquake. Impact projections suggest the flood could affect roughly 5 million people.

Major examples

One of the most devastating earthquakes in recorded history was the 1556 Shaanxi earthquake, which occurred on 23 January 1556 in Shaanxi, China. More than 830,000 people died. Most houses in the area were yaodongs—dwellings carved out of loess hillsides—and many victims were killed when these structures collapsed. The 1976 Tangshan earthquake, which killed between 240,000 and 655,000 people, was the deadliest of the 20th century.

The 1960 Chilean earthquake is the largest earthquake that has been measured on a seismograph, reaching 9.5 magnitude on 22 May 1960. Its epicenter was near Cañete, Chile. The energy released was approximately twice that of the next most powerful earthquake, the Good Friday earthquake (27 March 1964), which was centered in Prince William Sound, Alaska. The ten largest recorded earthquakes have all been megathrust earthquakes; however, of these ten, only the 2004 Indian Ocean earthquake is simultaneously one of the deadliest earthquakes in history.

Earthquakes that caused the greatest loss of life, while powerful, were deadly because of their proximity to either heavily populated areas or the ocean, where earthquakes often create tsunamis that can devastate communities thousands of kilometers away. Regions most at risk for great loss of life include those where earthquakes are relatively rare but powerful, and poor regions with lax, unenforced, or nonexistent seismic building codes.

Prediction

Earthquake prediction is a branch of the science of seismology concerned with the specification of the time, location, and magnitude of future earthquakes within stated limits. Many methods have been developed for predicting the time and place in which earthquakes will occur. Despite considerable research efforts by seismologists, scientifically reproducible predictions cannot yet be made to a specific day or month.

Forecasting

While forecasting is usually considered to be a type of prediction, earthquake forecasting is often differentiated from earthquake prediction. Earthquake forecasting is concerned with the probabilistic assessment of general earthquake hazards, including the frequency and magnitude of damaging earthquakes in a given area over years or decades. For well-understood faults the probability that a segment may rupture during the next few decades can be estimated.

Earthquake warning systems have been developed that can provide regional notification of an earthquake in progress, but before the ground surface has begun to move, potentially allowing people within the system's range to seek shelter before the earthquake's impact is felt.

Preparedness

The objective of earthquake engineering is to foresee the impact of earthquakes on buildings and other structures and to design such structures to minimize the risk of damage. Existing structures can be modified by seismic retrofitting to improve their resistance to earthquakes. Earthquake insurance can provide building owners with financial protection against losses resulting from earthquakes. Emergency management strategies can be employed by a government or organization to mitigate risks and prepare for consequences.

Artificial intelligence may help to assess buildings and plan precautionary operations: the Igor expert system is part of a mobile laboratory that supports the procedures leading to the seismic assessment of masonry buildings and the planning of retrofitting operations on them. It has been successfully applied to assess buildings in Lisbon, Rhodes, Naples.

Individuals can also take preparedness steps like securing water heaters and heavy items that could injure someone, locating shutoffs for utilities, and being educated about what to do when the shaking starts. For areas near large bodies of water, earthquake preparedness encompasses the possibility of a tsunami caused by a large earthquake.

Historical views

From the lifetime of the Greek philosopher Anaxagoras in the 5th century BCE to the 14th century CE, earthquakes were usually attributed to "air (vapors) in the cavities of the Earth." Thales of Miletus (625–547 BCE) was the only documented person who believed that earthquakes were caused by tension between the earth and water. Other theories existed, including the Greek philosopher Anaxamines' (585–526 BCE) beliefs that short incline episodes of dryness and wetness caused seismic activity. The Greek philosopher Democritus (460–371 BCE) blamed water in general for earthquakes. Pliny the Elder called earthquakes "underground thunderstorms".

In culture

Mythology and religion
In Norse mythology, earthquakes were explained as the violent struggle of the god Loki. When Loki, god of mischief and strife, murdered Baldr, god of beauty and light, he was punished by being bound in a cave with a poisonous serpent placed above his head dripping venom. Loki's wife Sigyn stood by him with a bowl to catch the poison, but whenever she had to empty the bowl the poison dripped on Loki's face, forcing him to jerk his head away and thrash against his bonds, which caused the earth to tremble.

In Greek mythology, Poseidon was the cause and god of earthquakes. When he was in a bad mood, he struck the ground with a trident, causing earthquakes and other calamities. He also used earthquakes to punish and inflict fear upon people as revenge.

In Japanese mythology, Namazu (鯰) is a giant catfish who causes earthquakes. Namazu lives in the mud beneath the earth and is guarded by the god Kashima who restrains the fish with a stone. When Kashima lets his guard fall, Namazu thrashes about, causing violent earthquakes.

In popular culture
In modern popular culture, the portrayal of earthquakes is shaped by the memory of great cities laid waste, such as Kobe in 1995 or San Francisco in 1906. Fictional earthquakes tend to strike suddenly and without warning. For this reason, stories about earthquakes generally begin with the disaster and focus on its immediate aftermath, as in Short Walk to Daylight (1972), The Ragged Edge (1968) or Aftershock: Earthquake in New York (1999). A notable example is Heinrich von Kleist's classic novella, The Earthquake in Chile, which describes the destruction of Santiago in 1647. Haruki Murakami's short fiction collection After the Quake depicts the consequences of the Kobe earthquake of 1995.

The most popular single earthquake in fiction is the hypothetical "Big One" expected of California's San Andreas Fault someday, as depicted in the novels Richter 10 (1996), Goodbye California (1977), 2012 (2009) and San Andreas (2015) among other works. Jacob M. Appel's widely anthologized short story, A Comparative Seismology, features a con artist who convinces an elderly woman that an apocalyptic earthquake is imminent.

Contemporary depictions of earthquakes in film are variable in the manner in which they reflect human psychological reactions to the actual trauma that can be caused to directly afflicted families and their loved ones. Disaster mental health response research emphasizes the need to be aware of the different roles of loss of family and key community members, loss of home and familiar surroundings, and loss of essential supplies and services to maintain survival. Particularly for children, the clear availability of caregiving adults who can protect, nourish, and clothe them in the aftermath of the earthquake, and to help them make sense of what has befallen them has been shown even more important to their emotional and physical health than the simple giving of provisions. As was observed after other disasters involving destruction and loss of life and their media depictions, recently observed in the 2010 Haiti earthquake, it is also important not to pathologize the reactions to loss and displacement or disruption of governmental administration and services, but rather to validate these reactions, to support constructive problem-solving and reflection as to how one might improve the conditions of those affected.

See also

 
 
 
 
 
 Lists of earthquakes

References

Sources
 
 .
 .
 , NUREG/CR-1457.
 Deborah R. Coen. The Earthquake Observers: Disaster Science From Lisbon to Richter (University of Chicago Press; 2012) 348 pages; explores both scientific and popular coverage
 .
 .
 .
 .

Further reading

External links

 Earthquake Hazards Program of the U.S. Geological Survey
 IRIS Seismic Monitor – IRIS Consortium

 
Geological hazards
Seismology
Natural disasters
Lithosphere